Eucithara elegans is a small sea snail, a marine gastropod mollusc in the family Mangeliidae.

Description
The length of the shell attains 9.6 mm, its diameter 4.1 mm.

The interstices of the narrow ribs are very beautifully elevately striated. The inner lip shows 9 - 11 teeth, the outer lip 13- 14. The shell is yellowish white, very faintly zoned with brown.

Distribution
This marine species occurs off the Philippines.

References

  Reeve, L.A. 1846. Monograph of the genus Mangelia. pls 1-8 in Reeve, L.A. (ed). Conchologia Iconica. London : L. Reeve & Co. Vol. 3.

External links
  Tucker, J.K. 2004 Catalog of recent and fossil turrids (Mollusca: Gastropoda). Zootaxa 682:1-1295.
 Kilburn R.N. 1992. Turridae (Mollusca: Gastropoda) of southern Africa and Mozambique. Part 6. Subfamily Mangeliinae, section 1. Annals of the Natal Museum, 33: 461–575

elegans
Gastropods described in 1846